Juan Ignacio Brex (born 26 May 1992) is an Argentine-Italian professional rugby union player who primarily plays centre for Benetton of the United Rugby Championship. He has also represented Italy at international level, having made his test debut against France during the 2021 Six Nations Championship. Brex has previously played for clubs such as San Cirano, Pampas XV, and Viadana in the past.

Professional career 
After playing for Argentina until 2015, in 2019 Brex was named in the Italy Sevens squad for the Qualifying Tournament for the 2020 Summer Olympics.

In January 2021, he was named in Italy squad.

References

External links 

Juan Ignacio Brex at Benetton Rugby

1992 births
Living people
Rugby union players from Buenos Aires
Benetton Rugby players
Argentine rugby union players
Pampas XV players
Rugby Viadana players
Italian rugby union players
Italy international rugby union players
Rugby union centres